Magdalene Sibylle of Brandenburg-Bayreuth (27 October 1612 – 20 March 1687) was Electress of Saxony from 1656 to 1680 as the wife of John George II. The daughter of Christian, Margrave of Brandenburg-Bayreuth, and Marie of Prussia, she was by birth a Markgräfin, or Margravine, and a member of the Brandenburg-Bayreuth branch of the House of Hohenzollern.

Life
Born in Bayreuth, she was her parents' fifth child. Her maternal grandparents were Albert Frederick, Duke of Prussia, and Marie Eleonore of Cleves. One of her maternal aunts was Duchess Anna of Prussia. She had three surviving siblings: Anna Maria (1609–1680), wife of Prince Johann Anton I von Eggenberg, Duke of Krumlov; Erdmann August (1615–1651); and George Albert (1619–1666).

She was married to John George, Prince Elector of Saxony, on 13 November 1638 in Dresden. He was her first cousin, being the son of her maternal aunt and namesake, Magdalene Sibylle of Prussia. Her sister-in-law and cousin was Magdalene Sibylle of Saxony.

Magdalene Sibylle had a good relationship with the Swedish royal family (the Queen consort from 1620 to 1632, Maria Eleonora of Brandenburg, was her first cousin) and was able to save the city of Pirna from attack by a letter to the Swedish commander in 1639, during the Thirty Years' War. In 1680 she was widowed and retired to Freiberg-Colditz.

She died in Dresden in 1687.

Issue
She had three children:

Sibylle Marie (Dresden, 16 September 1642 – Dresden, 27 February 1643), died young;
Erdmuthe Sophie (Dresden, 25 February 1644 – Schloss Bayreuth, 22 June 1670), married her cousin, Christian Ernst, Margrave of Brandenburg-Bayreuth, on 29 October 1662; died without issue;
John George III (Dresden, 20 June 1647 – Tübingen, 12 September 1691), his father's successor as John George III, Elector of Saxony.

References

|-

1612 births
1687 deaths
Electoral Princesses of Saxony
German people of the Thirty Years' War
House of Hohenzollern
People from Bayreuth
Electresses of Saxony
⚭Margravine Magdalene Sibylle of Brandenburgbayreuth
Burials at Freiberg Cathedral
Daughters of monarchs